Rosebud Violet Kurwijila, of Tanzania, is the African Union's Commissioner for Rural Economy and Agriculture. She previously had been Program Development Coordinator for ACTIONAID in Tanzania.

Biography

She holds a bachelor's degree in agriculture from Sokoine University of Agriculture, Tanzania (1976), Master's degree in Agricultural Economics from the University of London (1983) as well as a Master of Philosophy in Development Economics from the University of East Anglia (1994).

During her career, she has served on many occasions as consultant in various areas related to Agriculture, Rural Economy and Food Security. From 1995 – 1997, she was a senior consultant in a consultancy firm where she dealt with projects acquisition and projects execution.

She has published a wide range of articles in international journals on food security, rural economy, agricultural technology and other related issues.

Her areas of competence include programme management, policy formulation and personnel management.

She has four sons. Her husband, Professor Lusato Kurwijila, passed away in Morogoro, Tanzania on 8 August 2021.

References

External links
 Rosebud Kurwijila bio

Year of birth missing (living people)
Living people
Sokoine University of Agriculture alumni
Alumni of the University of London
Alumni of the University of East Anglia
African Union Commission members
20th-century Tanzanian women politicians